"Every Baby" is a song by European-American pop group The Kelly Family. It was produced by Kathy Kelly and Paddy Kelly for their ninth studio album Almost Heaven (1996) and features lead vocals by Maite Kelly. Released as the album's second single, the ballad reached the top five of the Swiss Singles Chart.

Formats and track listings

Credits and personnel 
Credits adapted from the liner notes of Almost Heaven.

Songwriting – The Kelly Family
Production – Kathy Kelly, Paddy Kelly
Executive production – Dan Kelly, Mike Ungefehr
Engineering, mixing – Günther Kasper, Max Carola
Mixing assistance – Georgi Nedeltschev, Kathy Kelly, Paddy Kelly
Mastering – Dieter Wegner, Georgi Nedeltschev

Charts

References

External links
 KellyFamily.de — official site

1996 songs
The Kelly Family songs